The Eastern Collegiate Football Conference is a football-only intercollegiate athletic conference affiliated with the NCAA's Division III. Founded in 2009, it combines six schools spread across the states of Massachusetts, Vermont, and New York, plus Washington, D.C.

History
The Eastern Collegiate Football Conference was formed in the spring of 2009 as an NCAA Division III single-sport football conference. The conference, named after the geographic location of the institutions, began competition in the fall of 2009. Founding members were Anna Maria College, Becker College, Castleton State College (now Castleton University), Gallaudet University, Husson University, SUNY Maritime, Mount Ida College, and Norwich University.

Norwich was the league's first champion, posting a perfect 6-0 conference record and defeating Mt. Ida in the season-ending ECFC Championship Game. In 2010, SUNY Maritime earned the ECFC's first bid to the NCAA Division III Playoffs after a perfect 10-0 regular season record. SUNY Maritime would go on to lose 60–0 to Alfred University in the First Round of the NCAA Playoffs.

2015 realignment
In April 2015, charter member Norwich announced it would be leaving the ECFC to join the NEWMAC when that conference began sponsoring football in 2017.  In November 2015, Becker announced it would also be leaving the ECFC in 2017 to join what was then known as the New England Football Conference, which by the time of the college's departure would be rebranded as Commonwealth Coast Football. Becker's departure would have left the ECFC without the minimum seven teams necessary to maintain the league's automatic bid to the Division III playoffs. But on January 27, 2016, the ECFC announced that Alfred State College and Dean College would be joining the conference for the 2017 season.

Later developments
The ECFC would later see two schools announce their departure from the conference, placing its automatic bid to the Division III playoffs in doubt once again. First, Husson announced in June 2017 that it would join Commonwealth Coast Football in 2019. Then, in April 2018, the financially struggling Mount Ida announced that it would close at the end of the 2017–18 school year, with the campus to be purchased by the University of Massachusetts Amherst. The following month, however, saw the announcement of a future member, as Keystone College, set to add football as a club sport in 2019 before upgrading to full varsity status in 2020, would join the ECFC upon reaching varsity status. On June 23, 2021, SUNY Maritime's departure from the ECFC at the end of 2022 for the New England Women's and Men's Athletic Conference was confirmed as it would be that conference's new football affiliate for the 2023 season. On April 1, 2022, Keystone announced its addition to the Landmark Conference as a football affiliate also for 2023, when Landmark starts its sponsorship of that sport.

Member schools

Current members

Notes

Former members
Because NCAA football is a fall sport, the year of departure is the calendar year after each school's final season of competition.

Champions 

 2009 Norwich (6–0)
 2010 SUNY Maritime (7–0)
 2011 Norwich (7–0)
 2012 Mount Ida (6–1)
 2013 Gallaudet (6–1)
 2014 Husson (7–0)
 2015 Norwich (6–1)
 2016 Husson (6–0)
 2017 Husson (7–0)
 2018 Husson (6–0)
 2019 Dean (4-1)
 2020 None
 2021 Anna Maria (5–1)
 2022 Gallaudet (5–1)

NCAA Division III playoff performance
The ECFC is generally regarded as one of the weakest conferences in the country. The ECFC's only Division III playoff win came in 2017. As of the 2019 season, the conference is 1–9 in the playoffs, with its member schools' games decided by an average score of 45–13. The single win was by two points, and one loss was in overtime; every other loss has been by more than two touchdowns.

References

External links

 

 
Sports leagues established in 2009